Reginald "Reg" James Nicholls (27 February 1922 – 28 April 1990) was an Australian rules footballer who played with Fitzroy in the Victorian Football League (VFL).

Career
Nicholls, a defender, could play as either a half back flanker or key defender. He made 83 appearances for Fitzroy in five seasons, which included a semi-final and preliminary final in 1947. A three-time Victorian interstate representative, Nicholls played against South Australia at the MCG in 1948, then twice in 1949, against both South Australia and Western Australia.

He left Fitzroy in 1951, to coach Golden Point, a club in the Ballarat Football League. Coach for two seasons, Nicholls was replaced by Lance Collins in 1953, but remained at Golden Point as a player. He was a member of Golden Point's 1953 premiership team.

Personal life
Nicholls was born in MacLeod, Victoria.

Reg was married with 2 Children.

His brother, Geoff Nicholls, played for Collingwood and Fitzroy.

References

External links

1922 births
Fitzroy Football Club players
Golden Point Football Club players
Golden Point Football Club coaches
Australian rules footballers from Melbourne
1990 deaths
People from the City of Banyule